Grandma's Restaurant in Samcheong-dong is a South Korea reality show program on KBS 2 starring Kim Young-chul, Eric Nam, JooE (Momoland), Stella Jang and Andy (Shinhwa). The show airs on KBS 2 starting from November 24, 2018. It is distributed and syndicated by KBS every Saturday at 22:45 (KST). The program also airs on KBS World with English subtitles.

Synopsis 
This is a show which features 6 grandmas from 6 different countries all over the world who come together to serve their traditional homemade meals in a pop-up restaurant located at Samcheong-dong, South Korea. The pop-up restaurant was opened for 2 weeks. In addition, this show also features 5 other artists who will be the employees of Grandma's restaurant to help the grandmas to run the restaurant.

Changes in Running Time

Casts (Employees)

Foreign Grandmas (Cooks) 

  Hungary - Anna
  Belgium - Veronica
  Costa Rica - Violeta
  Mexico - Odette
  Thailand - Nudaeng
  France - Laurence

Ratings 

 Ratings listed below are the individual corner ratings of Grandma's Restaurant in Samcheong-dong. (Note: Individual corner ratings do not include commercial time, which regular ratings include.)

Season 1

Awards and nominations

References

External links 
 Official Website 
 

Korean Broadcasting System
South Korean variety television shows
South Korean television shows
Korean-language television shows
2018 South Korean television series debuts
South Korean cooking television series
South Korean reality television series
Television series set in restaurants
2019 South Korean television series endings